Private Property is a 2006 French-language Belgian film directed by Joachim Lafosse. The film received the André Cavens Award for Best Film by the Belgian Film Critics Association (UCC).

Title
Nue propriété is French for bare ownership/property, i.e., without usufruct. In the film a woman considers selling the house in which she lives with her twin sons. The sons oppose this. They get support from their father, who claims bare ownership of the house, and wants to keep it for the twins.

Plot
Two young adult non-identical twin men, François and Thierry, still live with their mother. They are very close, e.g. they bathe together and wash each other's hair.

They are very upset when their mother wants to sell the house. The situation gets tense and the mother leaves the house for an indefinite time. The good relation between the twins deteriorates. In a fight one gets very badly injured. The other panics and feels guilty.

Cast
 Isabelle Huppert as Pascale
 Jérémie Renier as Thierry
 Yannick Renier as François
 Kris Cuppens as Jan
 Patrick Descamps as Luc
 Raphaëlle Lubansu as Anne
 Sabine Riche as Gerda
 Dirk Tuypens as Dirk
 Catherine Salée as Jan's friend
 Philippe Constant as Jan's friend
 Delphine Bibet as Karine

See also
 Isabelle Huppert on screen and stage

References

External links
 
 

2006 films
2006 drama films
2000s French-language films
Films directed by Joachim Lafosse
French drama films
Belgian drama films
French-language Belgian films
2000s French films